The geography of Toronto, Ontario, covers an area of  and is bounded by Lake Ontario to the south; Etobicoke Creek, Eglinton Avenue, and Highway 427 to the west; Steeles Avenue to the north; and the Rouge River and the Scarborough–Pickering Townline to the east. In addition to Etobicoke Creek and the Rouge River, the city is trisected by two minor rivers and their tributaries, the Humber River in the west end and the Don River east of downtown. Both flow southward to Lake Ontario at Humber Bay and Toronto Harbour respectively, which are part of the longer Waterfront, as well as Etobicoke Creek and the Rouge River.

The concentration and protection of Toronto's ravines allows for large tracts of densely forested valleys with recreational trails within the city. Approximately 26 to 28 percent of Toronto is covered with over ten million trees, a fairly high percentage within a large city in North America and there are ambitious proposals to double the coverage. Some parts of Toronto, such as High Park and the lower Humber River, are located in the northernmost parts of the Carolinian forest zone found in North America.

The shoreline of the former Lake Iroquois is a major east−west geological feature, which was formed at the end of the Last Glacial Period. In the west end, Davenport Road follows the ancient shoreline with the steps to Casa Loma rising above and downtown skyscrapers clearly visible to the southeast. It merges with the current Lake Ontario shoreline at the Scarborough Bluffs promontory.

The Toronto Islands are the only group of natural islands located on the western shores of Lake Ontario and were formed from the erosion of the Scarborough Bluffs. The Toronto Islands were originally a sand spit until a major storm separated them from the mainland during the 19th century.

Toronto's immediate neighbours are Mississauga and Brampton within the Regional Municipality of Peel, Vaughan and Markham within the Regional Municipality of York, and Pickering within the Regional Municipality of Durham. The Greater Toronto Area (GTA) includes the regional municipalities of Halton, Peel, York and Durham.

The GTA is part of a larger, natural ecosystem known as the Greater Toronto Bioregion. This ecosystem is bounded by Lake Ontario, the Niagara Escarpment, and the Oak Ridges Moraine, and includes many watersheds that drain into Lake Ontario.

In March 2005, the Government of Ontario unveiled the boundaries of a greenbelt around the Greater Toronto Area, a  area stretching from Niagara Falls to Peterborough. The green belt is designed to curb urban sprawl and to preserve valuable natural areas and farmland surrounding the city. However, some types of development including detached single residential, quarries and commercial facilities continue to get approved, exerting pressure and population growth on the Greenbelt. Toronto is among the latest in a line of cities that have implemented growth boundaries of some kind as a method of restricting urban growth, including Ottawa; Portland, Oregon; Frankfurt; Melbourne; Seoul and London.

Climate

Toronto's continental climate is moderated by Lake Ontario; its climate is among the mildest in Canada east of the Rocky Mountains, given Toronto's southerly latitude within the country. Downtown Toronto sits in a pocket of the humid continental climate (Köppen climate classification Dfa) zone found at the southwestern end of Lake Ontario covering the southern part of the city — including downtown (but excluding the Toronto Islands), where the annual average temperature exceeds . Some of Toronto, outside of the pre-1998 city limits, some suburban areas, and the Toronto Islands, fall within the Dfb climate regimen. This difference partly results from the urban heat island effect. Toronto is located in hardiness zone 7a, with decreasing hardiness further away from the downtown core (5b in the suburbs). There is a high degree of variability from year to year and sometimes over a period of days, particularly during the winter months.

This creates generally warmer nights through the colder season than would otherwise occur. When offshore winds blow in summer, they warm as they near the lakeshore in the evening; conversely, the cooling effect by the lake is most pronounced on spring afternoons, which can affect Toronto even more than other cities on the Great Lakes due its exposure to onshore winds from the east to southeast, on some days, the temperatures can be as much as  cooler than areas far removed from Lake Ontario, an effect that wanes by summer when the dominant windflow becomes more southwesterly and the lake surface temperature warms.

Springs and autumns are shorter seasons than summers and winters, and they feature varied weather with alternating periods of dry, sunny weather and rain. Many days in these seasons are sunny with pleasant rather than warm or cold temperatures. Nights are generally cool, but frosts are rare. Snow can fall in early spring or late fall but usually melt quickly after contact with the ground. Snowfall has been reported as early as October 1 and as late as May 28. Toronto's weather is affected by the relative position of the polar jet stream and continental storm track, both of which pass over or near to the area with some frequency. This is determined by a number of complex global weather drivers, such as ENSO, NOA/AO Oscillations and the Polar vortex.

There is no "dry season" as precipitation falls in all months with regularity (but mainly snow during the winter), but summer rains result mostly from thunderstorms, which make for higher average amounts as a general rule with occasional dry periods. February and March rank as the driest months on average.

Cherry blossom trees bloom in Toronto during late April and early May.

Winter and snowfall

Despite being cold, extended snow-free periods occur in most winter seasons and precipitation can fall as rain with temperatures sometimes climbing above .

There are usually a few colder periods where temperatures remain below  and less frequently below  at night (especially in the northern suburbs), with wind chills making it feel like .

Due to its position on the northwest shore of Lake Ontario, Toronto is not a direct target of heavy, wind−whipped lake-effect snow squalls that hit other Great Lake cities on the south/east shorelines of the lakes, in areas where prevailing winds amplify lake effect. Despite this, there are usually two or more heavy snowfalls each winter which deposit at least  accumulation, usually from powerful winter storms known as Alberta clippers, "Colorado Lows" or panhandle hooks that pick up moisture en route to the Great Lakes. These storms can produce strong easterly driven winds that fetch additional moisture from Lake Ontario. They frequently come with a volatile mix of snow, ice pellets, freezing rain and sometimes just ordinary rain, all of which can disrupt transportation, and in severe cases, interrupt power supply. A sustained freezing rain event occurred on December 22, 2013, plunging 30 percent of the city into darkness, some until after Christmas Day.

Such storms can also produce large snowfall amounts, higher totals found in areas closer to Lake Ontario, sometimes falling over a series of days or weeks creating havoc. On January 13, 1999, after a series of snowstorms, then-Toronto mayor Mel Lastman called in the Canadian Armed Forces to assist with snow removal and clearing streets. February 2008 set a record a snowfall record for the month with  falling at the airport. The official storm total at Pearson Airport was  

On the opposite extreme, the winter of 2011–12 had the lowest seasonal snowfall total with only . March 2012 was the warmest March on record. The least snowfall in a calendar year was 2006, with only . The El Niño influenced winter of 2009–10 had , March 2010 recorded no measurable snow, the first such occurrence in any March since 1946, and was followed by the warmest April ever on record.

Winter weather conditions in Toronto can vary greatly from one year to another and is significantly affected by global weather patterns such as El Niño–Southern Oscillation (ENSO). El Niño winters are generally mild and dry, with decreased snowfall (such as the winters of 2009–2010 and 2015–2016), while La Niña winters tend have more precipitation, with more snowfall (the aforementioned winters of 1999 and 2008 were La Niña), but are sometimes above average in terms of temperatures. ENSO Neutral years are more unpredictable, such as 2013-14 which was the coldest, longest winter in recent memory.

Summer

The subtropical jet can move well north of the area in the midsummer influenced largely by the strength and position of the Bermuda-Azores High and ridging over the North American continent, in some summers, it is a dominating influence.
Lake effect cooling varies greatly depending on location within the city and strength and direction of localized winds, variation in water temperature and currents due to recent weather, the most pronounced effect on the Toronto Islands and also on the immediate lakeshore such as in The Beaches, and Scarborough Bluffs, hence the term "cooler by the lake". This is less a factor in the west and northwest parts of the city. Temperatures over  occur on average seven days each year (three consecutive days of such temperatures is defined as a heat wave, which occur in most summers but maximums rarely exceed , which last occurred on July 21, 2011). However, coupled with high humidity, the humidex value can rise well above  during these heat events, creating great discomfort. Summer heat episodes are usually broken by cooler, drier periods that can be brief. 

Thunderstorms are also a regular occurrence and can pop up quickly, especially west and north of the city in areas more prone to the "lake breeze front" or "lake breeze thunderstorms" phenomenon, in which intense, sharply defined squall lines develop quickly on summer afternoons inland, amplified by localized variation in wind patterns between the Great Lakes. These storms sometimes, but not always move into the city causing localized flooding resulting from downpours with high rainfall amounts, intense lightning but less often severe winds knocking down trees and powerlines.

Severe weather and records

In addition to snowstorms, ice storms, windstorms, heavy rainfall events associated with tropical storms or very severe thunderstorms, tornadoes are rare but do occur, particularly in the northern and western suburbs. That area sits on the edge of "tornado alley" where tornadoes occur with the most frequency per area in Canada. Downtown Toronto, on the other hand, generally avoids tornadic storms resulting from lake breeze inflows which assist in breaking up formation of tornadoes. Tornado warnings have been posted for the city on a few occasions in the early 21st century, however, no touchdowns have been confirmed within city limits since a weak tornado hit Scarborough in 1998. A pair of dangerous F2 tornados did touchdown in neighbouring Vaughan during a tornado outbreak on August 20, 2009. A powerful derecho affected the city on May 21, 2022.

Toronto is susceptible to flash flooding due to its various ravines and valleys that can easily flood, as well as generally poor drainage due to its large urban area. Flooding can result from remnants of tropical storms, heavy rainfall combined with snowmelt, or summertime thunderstorms stalled out along lake breeze boundaries. Low-lying areas, such as the lower reaches of the Don River valley, are the most likely to flood. This often leads to the shutdown of the Don Valley Parkway and GO Transit's Richmond Hill line. A second mouth is being built for the Don River to mitigate flooding, creating Villiers Island.

The tropical storm remnant of Hurricane Hazel caused 81 deaths in October 1954 due to flooding that swept homes along river banks into Lake Ontario. A sudden downburst during a strong thunderstorm was believed to have played a contributing factor in the Air France Flight 358 crash on August 2, 2005. Just a few weeks later on August 19, part of a tornado outbreak in Southern Ontario, record-breaking intense rainfall, the worst since Hazel, deluged north-central sections of the city within a couple of hours and destroying a section of Finch Avenue West in North York resulting in record insurance claims. Another large rainstorm with intense, record rainfall amounts struck a wide swath of the city during the afternoon rush hour on July 8, 2013 flooding city streets, subway tunnels, basements and knocking out power for over two million residents, stranding commuters, some having to be rescued from a submerged train. Flood insurance claims are likely to exceed the 2005 storm due to a wider area affected. In the springs of 2017 and 2019, heavy rain combined with snowmelt led to the water levels of Lake Ontario to rise to record levels, flooding parts of the Toronto Islands and closing it to the public.

The most severe heat wave in Toronto occurred in 1936, during the 1936 North American heat wave, when downtown temperatures in Toronto exceeded  on three consecutive days (July 8 – 10), with nighttime temperatures not falling below . The city was ill-equipped at that time to handle such a prolonged extreme heat wave, and heat stroke claimed 225 lives in the city, not counting indirect deaths from causes such as drowning. The highest humidex (combined feel of temperature and humidity) reached  at the airport during the heat wave of July 1995, downtown it reached  on July 21, 2011 during the 2011 North American heat wave.

Other notable cold waves occurred in January 1994 and February 1934. Winter cold snaps pose a danger as they often come with high winds, leaving the city's homeless population very prone to frostbite and hypothermia.

Upward temperature trend
Based on public records provided by Environment Canada, the average annual temperature has increased  at Pearson Airport over a period of 30 years. If compared with the thirty-year normals from 1971 to 2000, more of this increase occurred at night: the average minimum temperature has been  higher. Average precipitation during the same period was close to the average of the previous period, snowfall totals down only marginally with slightly higher rainfall. In order from the top: December, September, July and January have seen the highest average temperature increases. Part of this warming is likely attributed to increased urban growth surrounding the airport.

An older study conducted in the 1990s analysed the heat island effect comparing data from selected regional stations, including both Downtown Toronto and Pearson Airport, enough for a large area of the old city limits, and parts of Etobicoke to have a different Köppen climate classification from the surrounding area.

Statistics

Topography

Toronto has numerous hills and valleys that were carved out during the last Ice Age. The ravines are largely undeveloped, primarily as the result of Hurricane Hazel in 1954.

A significant topographical feature is the old shoreline of the Glacial Lake Iroquois, known as the Iroquois Plain. The Iroquois Plain joins Lake Ontario at the Scarborough Bluffs where erosion and the currents of Lake Ontario have carried sand deposits into Toronto Harbour to form the Toronto Islands. Above the Iroquois Plain, the topography includes two features: the South Slope and the Peel Plain. The South Slope is the southern part of an interlobular moraine the Oak Ridges Moraine. The South Slope has a gentle slope as well, and experiences relatively high runoff as water infiltration is relatively low. The Peel Plain is mostly clay and generally flatter than the South Slope. Water infiltration is also low. Historically, the Peel Plain and South Slope were considered to be high-quality agricultural lands, unlike the Iroquois Plain, which is very sandy. These areas are now heavily urbanized. 

Both Dufferin Street and Caledonia Road between Davenport Road and Eglinton Avenue, in the York district, run across numerous steep hills and valleys and the neighbourhood in this area is named Fairbank. Fairbank and Silverthorn to the west have often been compared with the many hills that make up San Francisco. However, parts of the hills and valleys are slightly levelled for GO Transit's Barrie line that runs through this area.

Vaughan Road runs parallel to the buried Castle Frank Brook to the northeast.

The Don River is categorized as an underfit river, given that the river is too small for its much wider and deeper valley. The same is true for the Humber River, the Rouge River, and the various smaller waterways of Toronto.

Grenadier Pond in High Park is the largest body of water fully within Toronto's city limits. During the winter, it becomes a natural skating rink.

See also
 Fauna of Toronto
 List of Toronto parks
 Native trees in Toronto
 Toronto waterway system

Notes

References